Aragorn was a fictional winged horse appearing in American comic books published by Marvel Comics. Aragorn has served as a mount for various characters.

Fictional character biography

First Aragorn
Professor Nathan Garrett, the criminal Black Knight, developed genetic engineering techniques capable of granting a horse the wings of a bird. He used it to create a mount to ride during his criminal adventures. After Garrett's final defeat by Iron Man, this horse escaped, was found and further mutated by Victor Frankenstein's great-granddaughter Victoria (who had originally tried to restore it to normal), and fell into the possession of the Dreadknight, who named it the Hellhorse.

Second Aragorn
As Garrett was dying, he persuades his nephew Dane Whitman to take his scientific discoveries and use them for good. Whitman thus became a new, heroic Black Knight, and used his uncle's techniques to create another winged horse. This one he names Aragorn and uses as his mount. Aragorn helped the Black Knight and the Avengers battle the Masters of Evil; carried the Black Knight into battle against Le Sabre; helped the Black Knight and Doctor Strange battle Tiboro; carried the Black Knight alongside Doctor Strange and the Avengers as they battled Ymir and Surtur; carried the Black Knight to Olympus to battle Ares and the Enchantress, among numerous other adventures together.

When the Black Knight was turned into stone by the Enchantress, Aragorn was placed in the custody of his fellow Defender, the Valkyrie. Aragorn carried the Valkyrie and Namorita into battle against the Omegatron. When Whitman left his own time to stay for a while in the 12th century AD, he entrusted Aragorn to the care of the Valkyrie, who became his permanent companion. He came to live at the Richmond Riding Academy. He accompanied the Valkyrie to Asgard and Valhalla, and helped the Valkyrie, Harokin, and the Defenders battle Ollerus and Casiolena. With the Valkyrie, Aragorn helped form the New Defenders.

While Aragorn was with the Valkyrie, Dane Whitman gained a new flying horse named Strider from the Lady of the Lake.

Aragorn is still in the company of the Valkyrie.

Third Aragorn
Another Aragon served as a steed to Augustine du Lac, who was the Vatican Black Knight. He rode Aragorn at the time when he accompanied Klaw in his invasion of Wakanda.

When Kraven the Hunter's son Alyosha Kravinoff began collecting a zoo of animal-themed superbeings, Aragorn is clearly seen in one of the cages. However, after disobeying Kraven, Aragorn was killed to set an example to his other captives and then served up as food. The Marvel Pets Handbook confirmed that the Aragorn that was killed by Alyosha Kravinoff was the Vatican Black Knight's Aragorn.

Powers and abilities
Aragorn was a normal horse until Dane Whitman used Nathan Garrett's techniques to give him large, fully feathered wings that allow him to fly. He is an experienced battle steed on land and aloft. Aragorn's enhanced intelligence gives him an excellent rapport with both the Valkyrie and Dane Whitman, enabling him to understand and obey complex commands.

References

External links
 Aragorn at Marvel Wiki
 Vatican Black Knight's Aragorn at Marvel Wiki
 Aragorn at Comic Vine

Characters created by Roy Thomas
Comics characters introduced in 1968
Fictional horses
Marvel Comics superheroes